Matt Connor (born 1960 in Walsh Island, County Offaly) is an Irish former Gaelic footballer who played for his local club Walsh Island and at senior level for the Offaly county team from 1978 until 1984, when he was seriously injured in a car crash.

Connor's display for Offaly in the 1980 All-Ireland Semi-Final against Kerry, scoring 2–09, was his signature performance and is considered one of the best personal performances in the history of Gaelic football.

He was interviewed for the documentary Players of the Faithful.

In May 2020, the Irish Independent named Connor at number six in its "Top 20 footballers in Ireland over the past 50 years".

References

External links

1960 births
Living people
Gaelic football forwards
Garda Síochána officers
Walsh Island Gaelic footballers
Offaly inter-county Gaelic footballers
Leinster inter-provincial Gaelic footballers
Winners of one All-Ireland medal (Gaelic football)